Acanthocoris scaber is a species of leaf-footed bug in the order Hemiptera. It is a crop pest in China.

Taxonomy 
A. scaber was described in 1763 by Carl Linnaeus. The prefix "acantho-" in the genus name comes from the Greek akantha, meaning "thorn." "Coris" signifies the Greek word for bed bugs, κόρις. The specific epithet, "scaber" indicates the rough back of the insect.

Distribution 
A. scaber is found mainly in South and Southeast Asia. It is diurnal.

Relationship with humans 
A. scaber has been found to feed on many vegetable species in China, especially chili peppers.

Parasites 
An assessment of A. scaber eggs discovered that parasitic wasps from the genus Gryon, specifically the species Gryon ancinla, have been found there.

References 

Coreidae
Insects described in 1763
Taxa named by Carl Linnaeus